Mirzapur is a town of Mirzapur Upazila, Tangail, Bangladesh.

Demographics
According to the 2011 Bangladesh census, Mirzapur town had 6,129 households and a population of 28,602. The literacy rate (age 7 and over) was 69.7% (male: 71%, female: 68.6%).

See also
 Kalihati
 Ghatail

References

Tangail District
Towns in Bangladesh
Populated places in Tangail District
Pourashavas of Bangladesh